Derek Jones is an American college football coach and former professional player. Jones is currently the cornerbacks coach for Virginia Tech Hokies football, serving under first-year head coach Brent Pry. He played cornerback in the Canadian Football League (CFL) and Arena Football League (AFL).

Early life
Jones was born in Woodruff, South Carolina. He later earned a degree in Public Administration from Ole Miss, where he also played as a cornerback. Jones also played in the CFL for the Toronto Argonauts and the Edmonton Eskimos. Jones played in the AFL for the Nashville Kats.

Coaching career

Assistant coaching career
A coaching veteran, Jones has been an assistant coach at numerous stops and has worked under several head coaches, including David Cutcliffe at Duke and Ole Miss, Tommy West at Memphis, Steve Kragthorpe at Tulsa, Joe Pannunzio at Murray State, and, most recently, Matt Wells at Texas Tech.

Virginia Tech
During December 2021, Coach Brent Pry announced that Jones would be joining his new staff as a defensive assistant at Virginia Tech.

References 

Living people
Ole Miss Rebels football players
Toronto Argonauts players
Edmonton Elks players
Nashville Kats players
Ole Miss Rebels football coaches
Murray State Racers football coaches
Middle Tennessee Blue Raiders football coaches
Tulsa Golden Hurricane football coaches
Memphis Tigers football coaches
Duke Blue Devils football coaches
Texas Tech Red Raiders football coaches
Virginia Tech Hokies football coaches
Year of birth missing (living people)
People from Woodruff, South Carolina